Mīrzā Muhammad Tāraghay bin Shāhrukh, better known as Ulugh Beg (22 March 1394 – 27 October 1449), was a Timurid sultan, as well as an astronomer and mathematician. 

Ulugh Beg was notable for his work in astronomy-related mathematics, such as trigonometry and spherical geometry, as well as his general interests in the arts and intellectual activities. It is thought that he spoke five languages: Arabic, Persian, Turkic, Mongolian, and a small amount of Chinese. During his rule (first as a governor, then outright) the Timurid Empire achieved the cultural peak of the Timurid Renaissance through his attention and patronage. Samarkand was captured and given to Ulugh Beg by his father Shah Rukh.

He built the great Ulugh Beg Observatory in Samarkand between 1424 and 1429. It was considered by scholars to have been one of the finest observatories in the Islamic world at the time and the largest in Central Asia. Ulugh Beg was subsequently recognized as the most important observational astronomer from the 15th century by many scholars. He also built the Ulugh Beg Madrasah (1417–1420) in Samarkand and Bukhara, transforming the cities into cultural centers of learning in Central Asia.

However, Ulugh Beg's scientific expertise was not matched by his skills in governance. During his short reign, he failed to establish his power and authority. As a result, other rulers, including his family, took advantage of his lack of control, and he was subsequently overthrown and assassinated.

Early life 
He was a grandson of the great conqueror and king, Timur (Tamerlane) (1336–1405), and the oldest son of Shah Rukh, both of whom came from the Turkicized Barlas tribe of Transoxiana (now Uzbekistan). His mother was a noblewoman named Gawhar Shad, daughter of a member of the representative Turkic tribal aristocracy, Ghiyasuddin Tarkhan. 

Ulugh Beg was born in Sultaniyeh during his grandfather's invasion of Persia. He was given the name Mīrzā Muhammad Tāraghay. Ulugh Beg, the name he most commonly known by, was not truly a personal name, but rather a moniker, which can be loosely translated as "Great Ruler" (compare modern Turkish ulu, "great", and bey, "chief") and is the Turkic equivalent of Timur's Perso-Arabic title Amīr-e Kabīr. 

As a child he wandered through a substantial part of the Middle East and India as his grandfather expanded his conquests in those areas. After Timur's death, Shah Rukh moved the empire's capital to Herat (in modern Afghanistan). Sixteen-year-old Ulugh Beg subsequently became the governor of the former capital of Samarkand in 1409. In 1411, he was named the sovereign ruler of the whole of Mavarannahr.

Science 

The teenage ruler set out to turn the city into an intellectual center for the empire. Between 1417 and 1420, he built a madrasa ("university" or "institute") on Registan Square in Samarkand (currently in Uzbekistan), and he invited numerous Islamic astronomers and mathematicians to study there. The madrasa building still survives. Ulugh Beg's most famous pupil in astronomy was Ali Qushchi (died in 1474). Qadi Zada al-Rumi was the most notable teacher at Ulugh Beg's madrasa and Jamshid al-Kashi, an astronomer, later came to join the staff.

Astronomy 

Astronomy piqued Ulugh Beg's interest when he visited the Maragheh Observatory at a young age. This observatory, located in Maragheh, Iran, is where the well-known astronomer Nasir al-Din al-Tusi practised.

In 1428, Ulugh Beg built an enormous observatory, similar to Tycho Brahe's later Uraniborg as well as Taqi al-Din's observatory in Constantinople. The Fakhri sextant was the largest instrument at the observatory in Samarkand (an image of the sextant is on the side of this article). There were many other astronomical instruments located at the observatory, but the Fakhri sextant is the most well-known instrument there. The purpose of the Fakhri sextant was to measure the transit altitudes of the stars. This was a measurement of the maximum altitude above the horizon of the stars. It was only possible to use this device to measure the declination of celestial objects. The image, which can be found in this article, shows the remaining portion of the instrument, which consists of the underground, lower portion of the instrument that was not destroyed. The observatory built by Ulugh Beg was the most pervasive and well-known observatory throughout the Islamic world.

With the instruments located in the observatory in Samarkand, Ulugh Beg composed a star catalogue consisting of 1018 stars, which is eleven fewer stars than are present in the star catalogue of Ptolemy. Ulugh Beg utilized dimensions from al-Sufi and based his star catalogue on a new analysis that was autonomous from the data used by Ptolemy. Throughout his life as an astronomer, Ulugh Beg came to realize that there were multiple mistakes in the work and subsequent data of Ptolemy that had been in use for many years.

Using it, he compiled the 1437 Zij-i-Sultani of 994 stars, generally considered the greatest star catalogue between those of Ptolemy and Tycho Brahe, a work that stands alongside Abd al-Rahman al-Sufi's Book of Fixed Stars. The serious errors which he found in previous Arabian star catalogues (many of which had simply updated Ptolemy's work, adding the effect of precession to the longitudes) induced him to redetermine the positions of 992 fixed stars, to which he added 27 stars from Abd al-Rahman al-Sufi's catalogue Book of Fixed Stars from the year 964, which were too far south for observation from Samarkand. This catalogue, one of the most original of the Middle Ages, was first edited by Thomas Hyde at Oxford in 1665 under the title Jadāvil-i Mavāzi' S̱avābit,  and reprinted in 1767 by G. Sharpe. More recent editions are those by Francis Baily in 1843 in Vol. XIII of the Memoirs of the Royal Astronomical Society, and by Edward Ball Knobel in Ulugh Beg's Catalogue of Stars, Revised from all Persian Manuscripts Existing in Great Britain, with a Vocabulary of Persian and Arabic Words (1917).

In 1437, Ulugh Beg determined the length of the sidereal year as 365.2570370...d = 365d 6h 10m 8s (an error of +58 seconds). In his measurements over the course of many years he used a 50 m high gnomon. This value was improved by 28 seconds in 1525 by Nicolaus Copernicus, who appealed to the estimation of Thabit ibn Qurra (826–901), which had an error of +2 seconds. However, Ulugh Beg later measured another more precise value of the tropical year as 365d 5h 49m 15s, which has an error of +25 seconds, making it more accurate than Copernicus's estimate which had an error of +30 seconds. Ulugh Beg also determined the Earth's axial tilt as 23°30'17" in the sexagesimal system of degrees, minutes and seconds of arc, which in decimal notation converts to 23.5047°.

Mathematics 
In mathematics, Ulugh Beg wrote accurate trigonometric tables of sine and tangent values correct to at least eight decimal places.

War of succession and death 

In 1447, upon learning of the death of his father Shah Rukh, Ulugh Beg went to Balkh. Here, he heard that Ala al-Dawla, the son of his late brother Baysunghur, had claimed the rulership of the Timurid Empire in Herat. Consequently, Ulugh Beg marched against Ala al-Dawla and met him in battle at Murghab. He defeated his nephew and advanced toward Herat, massacring its people in 1448. However, Abul-Qasim Babur Mirza, Ala al-Dawla's brother, came to the latter's aid and defeated Ulugh Beg.

Ulugh Beg retreated to Balkh where he found that its governor, his oldest son Abdal-Latif Mirza, had rebelled against him. Another civil war ensued. Abdal-Latif recruited troops to meet his father's army on the banks of the Amu Darya river. However, Ulugh Beg was forced to retreat to Samarkand before any fighting took place, having heard news of turmoil in the city. Abdal-Latif soon reached Samarkand and Ulugh Beg involuntarily surrendered to his son. Abd-al-Latif released his father from custody, allowing him to make pilgrimage to Mecca. However, he ensured Ulugh Beg never reached his destination, having him, as well as his brother Abdal-Aziz assassinated in 1449. 

Eventually, Ulugh Beg's reputation was rehabilitated by his nephew, Abdallah Mirza (1450–1451), who placed his remains at Timur's feet in the Gur-e-Amir in Samarkand, where they were found by Soviet archaeologists in 1941.

Marriages

Ulugh Beg had thirteen wives:

 Aka Begi Begum, daughter of Muhammad Sultan Mirza bin Jahangir Mirza and Khan Sultan Khanika, mother of Habiba Sultan known as Khanzada Begum and another Khanzada Begum;
 Sultan Badi al-mulk Begum, daughter of Khalil Sultan bin Miran Shah and Shad Malik Agha;
 Aqi Sultan Khanika, daughter of Sultan Mahmud Khan Ogeday;
 Husn Nigar Khanika, daughter of Shams-i-Jahan Khan Chaghatay;
 Shukr Bīka Khanika, daughter of Darwīsh Khan of the Golden Horde;
 Rukaiya Sultan Agha, an Arlat lady, and mother of Abdal-Latif Mirza, Ak Bash Begum and Sultan Bakht Begum;
 Mihr Sultan Agha, daughter of Tukal bin Sarbuka;
 Sa'adat Bakht Agha, daughter of Bayan Kukaltash, mother of Qutlugh Turkhan Agha;
 Daulat Sultan Agha, daughter of Khawand Sa'id;
 Bakhti Bi Agha, daughter of Aka Sufi Uzbek;
 Daulat Bakht Agha, daughter of Sheikh Muhammad Barlas;
 Sultanim Agha, mother of Abdul Hamid Mirza and Abdul Jabrar Mirza;
 Sultan Malik Agha, daughter of Nasir-al-Din, mother of Ubaydullah Mirza, Abdullah Mirza and another Abdullah Mirza;

Legacy

 The crater, Ulugh Beigh, on the Moon, was named after him by the German astronomer Johann Heinrich von Mädler on his 1830 map of the Moon.
 2439 Ulugbek, a main-belt asteroid which was discovered on 21 August 1977 by N. Chernykh at Nauchnyj, was named after him.
 The dinosaur Ulughbegsaurus was named after him in 2021.

Exhumation
Soviet anthropologist Mikhail M. Gerasimov reconstructed the face of Ulugh Beg. Like his grandfather Timurlane, Ulugh Beg is close to the Mongoloid type with slightly Europoid features. His father Shah Rukh had predominantly Caucasoid features, with no obvious Mongoloid feature.

See also 
 Ulugh Beg Observatory and Museum
 Ulugh Beg Madrasa in Samarkand
 Ancient Astronomer: Aryabhata

Notes

References 
 
 1839. L. P. E. A. Sedillot (1808–1875). Tables astronomiques d’Oloug Beg, commentees et publiees avec le texte en regard, Tome I, 1 fascicule, Paris. A very rare work, but referenced in the Bibliographie generale de l’astronomie jusqu’en 1880, by J.
 1847. L. P. E. A. Sedillot (1808–1875). Prolegomenes des Tables astronomiques d’Oloug Beg, publiees avec Notes et Variantes, et precedes d’une Introduction. Paris: F. Didot.
 1853. L. P. E. A. Sedillot (1808–1875). Prolegomenes des Tables astronomiques d’Oloug Beg, traduction et commentaire. Paris.
 Le Prince Savant annexe les étoiles, Frédérique Beaupertuis-Bressand, in Samarcande 1400–1500, La cité-oasis de Tamerlan : coeur d'un Empire et d'une Renaissance, book directed by Vincent Fourniau, éditions Autrement, 1995, .
 L'âge d'or de l'astronomie ottomane, Antoine Gautier, in L'Astronomie, (Monthly magazine created by Camille Flammarion in 1882), December 2005, volume 119.
 L'observatoire du prince Ulugh Beg, Antoine Gautier, in L'Astronomie, (Monthly magazine created by Camille Flammarion in 1882), October 2008, volume 122.
 Le recueil de calendriers du prince timouride Ulug Beg (1394–1449), Antoine Gautier, in Le Bulletin, n° spécial Les calendriers, Institut National des Langues et Civilisations Orientales, juin 2007, pp. 117–123. d
 Jean-Marie Thiébaud, Personnages marquants d'Asie centrale, du Turkestan et de l'Ouzbékistan, Paris, éditions L'Harmattan, 2004. .

Further reading 

  (PDF version)

External links 

 
 The observatory and memorial museum of Ulugbek
 Bukhara Ulugbek Madrasah
 Registan the heart of ancient Samarkand.
 Biography by School of Mathematics and Statistics University of St Andrews, Scotland
 Legacy of Ulug Beg

1394 births
1449 deaths
Astronomers of the medieval Islamic world
Independent scientists
Male murder victims
Mathematicians of the medieval Islamic world
Medieval Turkic astronomers
Medieval Turkic mathematicians
People from Herat
Scientific instrument makers
Timurid monarchs
Timurid dynasty
15th-century Muslims
15th-century mathematicians
15th-century astronomers
15th-century monarchs in Asia
15th-century murdered monarchs